Kraft Foods Inc. was a multinational confectionery, food and beverage conglomerate. It marketed many brands in more than 170 countries. 12 of its brands annually earned more than $1 billion worldwide: Cadbury, Jacobs, Kraft, LU, Maxwell House, Milka, Nabisco, Oreo, Oscar Mayer, Philadelphia, Trident, and Tang.  Forty of its brands were at least a century old.

The company was headquartered in Northfield, Illinois, near Chicago.

Kraft was listed on the New York Stock Exchange and became a component of the Dow Jones Industrial Average on September 22, 2008, replacing the American International Group. In August 2011, the company announced plans to split into a North American grocery products business and a faster-growing global snacks company. The snack company, Mondelez International Inc. is recognized as the old Kraft Foods' legal successor, while the grocery company was named Kraft Foods, now a part of Kraft Heinz.

History

Origin of the firm
Kraft Foods traced its roots to the National Dairy Products Corporation, formed on December 10, 1923, by Thomas H. McInerney and Edward E. Rieck. The firm was initially set up to execute on a rollup strategy in the fragmented United States ice cream industry. Through acquisitions it expanded into a full range of dairy products. By 1930 it was the largest dairy company in the United States and the world, exceeding Borden.

McInnerney operated the Hydrox Corporation, an ice cream company located in Chicago, Illinois. In 1923 he went to Wall Street to convince investment bankers there to finance his scheme for consolidating the United States ice cream industry. He initially found "hard sledding" with one banker saying the dairy industry "lacked dignity". He persevered and convinced a consortium including Goldman Sachs and Lehman Brothers to finance a roll-up strategy.

As a result of his efforts, National Dairy Products Corporation was formed in 1923 in a merger of McInnerney's Hydrox with Rieck McJunkin Dairy Co of Pittsburgh, Pennsylvania. The resulting firm was then listed on the New York Stock Exchange with the offer of 125,000 shares having been oversubscribed.

The firm grew quickly through a large number of acquisitions. As is typical in a roll-up strategy, acquisitions were primarily for stock in National rather than cash. National Dairy Products Corporation acquired more than 55 firms between 1923 and 1931, with a few notable entities among those:

Beginnings for Kraft

Born in Stevensville, Ontario, Canada in 1874, James L. Kraft immigrated to the United States in 1903 and started a wholesale door-to-door cheese business in Chicago; its first year of operations was "dismal", losing US$3,000 and a horse. However, the business took hold and Kraft was joined by his four brothers to form J.L. Kraft and Bros. Company in 1909. As early as 1911, circulars and advertisements were in use by the company.

In 1912, the company established its New York City, headquarters to prepare for its international expansion. By 1914, thirty-one varieties of cheeses were being sold around the U.S. because of heavy product development, expansion by marketing, and opening a wholly owned cheese factory in Stockton, Illinois.

In 1915, the company had invented pasteurized processed cheese that did not need refrigeration, thus giving a longer shelf life than conventional cheese. The process was patented in 1916 and about six million pounds of the product were sold to the U.S. Army for military rations during World War I.

In 1916, the company began national advertising and had made its first acquisition—a Canadian cheese company.

In 1924, the company changed its name to Kraft Cheese Company and listed on the Chicago Stock Exchange. In 1926, it was listed on the NYSE. The firm then began to consolidate the United States dairy industry through acquisition, in competition with National and Borden. Firms acquired included:

in May 1926 the Kraft Walker Cheese Co. was registered in Australia. It was a separate company from Fred Walker & Co. but managed by the same staff. Fred Walker was chairman by 1930, and after his death in July 1935, Kraft acquired the company.

Later, in 1927, it established its London, United Kingdom, and Hamburg, Germany, sales offices—its first forays outside North America. Sales for 1927 were $60.4m.

In 1928, it acquired Phenix Cheese Company, the maker of a cream cheese branded as Philadelphia cream cheese, founded by Jason F. Whitney, Sr. and the company changed its name to Kraft-Phenix Cheese Company.

In 1929, The New York Times reported that Kraft Phenix, The Hershey Company and Colgate were looking at merging. In the same year, it was reported that National, Borden and Standard Brands (a firm that is now part of Kraft Foods) were all looking at acquiring the firm.

By 1930, it had captured forty percent of the cheese market in the U.S. and was the third largest dairy company in the United States after National Dairy and Borden.

Post National acquisition of Kraft-Phenix
At the time of the acquisition in 1930, National Dairy had sales of $315m compared with $85m for Kraft Phenix. National Dairy management ran the combined business. Following the Kraft-Phenix acquisition, the firm continued to be called National Dairy until 1969 when it changed its name to Kraftco.

Historically, all of the firm's sales came from dairy products. However, the firm's product lines began to diversify away from dairy products to caramel candies, macaroni and cheese dinners and margarines. From the 1950s onward, the firm began to move away from low value added commodity dairy products, such as fluid milk. This trend would continue for the firm, through neglect and divestiture, until the primary remaining dairy product produced by the firm would be cheese. As a result, the modern history of the firm emphasizes the cheese history.

In 1933, the company began marketing by radio sponsorship. In 1935, the Sealtest brand of ice cream was launched as a unified national brand to replace the firm's numerous regional brands.

During World War II, the company sent four million pounds of cheese to Britain weekly.

Product development and advertising helped the company to grow during the postwar years, launching sliced process cheese and Cheez Whiz, a brand of process cheese sauce, in the 1950s.

During these years, Thomas McInnerney, National Dairy's founder, and James L. Kraft, Kraft's founder, died, and at the end of the decade, the divisions became less autonomous and even diversified to the glass-packaging business with the acquisition of Metro Glass in 1956.

In 1947, the company tested the marketing power of the emerging medium of television by producing an hour-long drama/anthology series, the Kraft Television Theatre. The product advertised on the program, MacLaren's Imperial Cheese, was selected because "... [it had] not only had no advertising appropriation whatsoever, but had not even been distributed for several years." As described by internal documents of J. Walter Thompson—the advertising firm which conceived of the marketing test—the result was "although there was no other advertising support for it whatsoever, still grocery stores could not keep up with the demand."

In the 1960s, product development became intense, launching fruit jellies, fruit preserves, marshmallows, barbecue sauces and Kraft Singles, a brand of individually wrapped cheese slices. During this decade, the company also expanded in many markets worldwide.

In 1961, the firm acquired Dominion Dairies of Canada, marking the first effort by the firm to expand into fluid milk and ice cream outside the United States. In the same year it also acquired The Southern Oil Company in Manchester, England.

National Dairy becomes Kraft
In 1969, the firm changed its name from National Dairy to Kraftco Corporation. The reason for the name change was given at the time: "Expansion and innovation have taken us far afield from the regional milk and ice cream business we started with in 1923. Dollar sales of these original products have remained relatively static over the past ten years and, in 1969 accounted for approximately 25% of our sales."
At the same time, the firm transferred to Glenview, Illinois, in 1972. In 1976, its name changed to Kraft, Inc. to emphasize the trademark the company had been known for and as a result of the fact that dairy, other than cheese, was now only a minor part of the company's sales. Reorganization also occurred after the name change.

Dart merger

In 1980, Kraft merged with Dart Industries—makers of the Duracell brand of batteries, Tupperware brand of plastic containers, West Bend brand of home appliances, Wilsonart brand of plastics and Thatcher glass—to form Dart & Kraft.

During the 1980s, Dart & Kraft offered mixed results to its shareholders, as new acquisitions in the food business—such as Churny premium cheeses, Lender's Bagels, Frusen Gladje ice cream and Celestial Seasonings tea—slightly offset the lagging nonfood business—Tupperware's decrease in sales and KitchenAid's (acquired soon after the merger) slide in market share—leading Dart & Kraft to spin off its nonfood business (except Duracell batteries) into a new entity (Premark International, Inc.) while changing its name back to Kraft, Inc. Premark was bought by Illinois Tool Works in 1999. In 1988, Kraft sold Duracell to private equity firm Kohlberg Kravis Roberts, who then put it into an initial public offering in 1989. Gillette bought Duracell in 1996, and itself was acquired by Procter and Gamble in 2005.

Philip Morris acquisition and merger with General Foods

At the end of 1988, Philip Morris Companies purchased Kraft for $12.9 billion. In 1989, Kraft merged with Philip Morris's General Foods unit—makers of Oscar Mayer meats, Maxwell House coffee, Jell-O gelatin, Budget Gourmet frozen dinners, Entenmann's baked goods, Kool-Aid, Crystal Light and Tang powdered beverage mixes, Post Cereals, Shake 'n Bake flavored coatings and numerous other packaged foods—as Kraft General Foods. Its aggressive product development was reversed after the merger, as it became slow in addressing issues on its product lines due to its size, and also company politics.

In 1990, the company acquired Jacobs Suchard (a European coffee and confectionery giant) and Freia Marabou (a Scandinavian confectionery maker) to expand overseas as its business was heavily dependent on the U.S.  In 1993, it acquired RJR Nabisco's cold cereal business (mainly Shredded Wheat and Shreddies cereals) while selling its Breyers ice-cream division to Unilever and its Birds Eye unit to Dean Foods. In 1994, it sold its frozen dinners unit to H.J. Heinz and in 1995, it sold its foodservice unit.

In 1995, it changed its name to the present name, Kraft Foods. The same year, it sold its bakery division (except Lender's Bagels, which was sold in 1996 to Kellogg Company), its candy division and its tablespreads division. Log Cabin syrup was sold in 1997.

On August 2, 1996, Kraft announced a deal with PepsiCo to market the Taco Bell brand of grocery products.

As of 2007, Philip Morris (now Altria Inc.) had sold its stake in Kraft foods and the two companies are no longer affiliated.

Financial expansion
In 2000, Philip Morris (renamed Altria in 2003) acquired Nabisco Holdings for $18.9 billion and merged the company with Kraft Foods the same year. In 2001, Philip Morris sold 280 million Kraft shares via the third-largest IPO of all time, retaining an 88.1% stake in the company.

In 2004, it sold its sugar confectionery division to Wrigley, while doing minor divestitures—including its hot cereals division (Cream of Wheat) to B&G Foods in 2007, its pet snacks division (Milk-Bone) to Del Monte Foods in 2006, juice drinks and Fruit2o to Sunny Delight Beverages in 2007 and some grocery brands in 2006.

In 2006, the company bought Southern European business of United Biscuits, gaining several local brands such as Galletas Fontanenda.

Investor Nelson Peltz bought a three-percent stake at Kraft Foods and was talking with the executives on revitalizing the business, with options such as buying Wendy's fast-food chain or selling off Post cereals and Maxwell House coffee.
On January 31, 2007, after months of speculation, the company announced that its 88.1% stake would be spun off to Altria shareholders at the end of March 2007, giving each approximately 0.7 shares of Kraft for each share of Altria they owned. Kraft became an independent publicly held company.

In July 2007, the company bought Groupe Danone's biscuit (cookie) and cereal division for $7.2 billion, including iconic French biscuit brand Lefèvre-Utile. While two years earlier firestorms of protest had arisen over plans for American PepsiCo's hostile takeover of the French company, Kraft's announcement was not met with the same protests, in part because Kraft agreed not to close French factories and keep the new merged divisions headquarters near Paris for at least three years.

In November 2007, Kraft agreed to sell its cereal unit to Ralcorp Holdings, a major private-label food maker, for $2.6 billion in a form of a spin-off merger. This would add 50% to Ralcorp's sales, to $3.3 billion, and will be used for Kraft's debt payment, which was at $13.4 billion, in danger of a downgrade by Standard and Poor's.

In February 2008, Berkshire Hathaway run by billionaire investor Warren E. Buffett announced that it had acquired an 8% stake in Kraft then worth over $4 billion. Buffett's business partner Charles Munger had also invested over $300 million in Kraft.  Berkshire Hathaway owned 5.6% of the outstanding stock of Kraft Foods, as reported in the holding company's 2010 annual report.

On September 22, 2008, the company replaced the troubled insurance company, American International Group in the Dow Jones Industrial Average.

Purchase of Cadbury
On September 7, 2009, Kraft made a £10.2 billion takeover offer for the long-established British confectionery group Cadbury, makers of Dairy Milk and Bournville chocolate. On November 9, 2009, Kraft's £9.8bn takeover bid was rejected by Cadbury. Cadbury stated that the takeover bid was a "derisory" offer. Kraft renewed the offer under the same terms on December 4, 2009. The offer generated significant political and public opposition in the United Kingdom and abroad, even leading to calls for the government to implement a policy of economic protectionism in cases of takeovers of large companies.
On January 19, 2010, Cadbury finally approved a revised offer from Kraft, valuing the confectionery business at $19.5 billion (£11.5 billion). The funding for the takeover was partially provided by the Royal Bank of Scotland, the British part-state-owned bank.

The Cadbury purchase was part of the long-term strategy of Irene Rosenfeld, CEO and Kraft Chairman since March 2007, who developed a three-year turnaround plan designed to drive the profitable growth of Kraft Foods. Rosenfeld wanted to develop new markets and expand product range when she assumed the role of chairman. It was assumed that the purchase of Cadbury would help Kraft products develop in new markets such as Brazil and India because of Cadbury's current strong presence in those markets. India is one of its most resilient markets with sales growth of 20% and profits growing at 30% in a competitive market. Kraft believed the Cadbury purchase was also necessary because of the likelihood of Nestlé and Hershey joining together. Kraft also believed it could squeeze savings of at least $675m annually by the end of the third year. Irene Rosenfeld saw the Kraft Cadbury merger as the "logical next step in our transformation toward a high-growth, higher-margin company". She also justified the merger in order to build a "global powerhouse in snacks, confectionery and quick meals".

Following the purchase of Cadbury, Kraft commanded 14.8% of the global candy and gum market. Kraft argued that it could take advantage of the Cadbury distribution in developing markets of India, Brazil and Mexico. As incomes rise in these developing nations, Kraft hopes that products such as Oreo will become impulse buys for children. Mars, Inc. is second in the confectionery market with 14.6% share, followed by Nestlé with 7.8%.

At the time of the purchase, the chocolate and sugar industry had been growing rapidly at 15% over the previous three years and was valued at $113 billion. The purchase of Cadbury was considered strange because they did not have a strong foothold on the confectionery market, but at the time Kraft noted their production of confectionery foods like Toblerone and candy foods like Oreo. Cadbury also owned popular gum brands such as Stride, Trident, Dentyne, and Chiclets. Roger Carr, chairman of Cadbury, discussed his approval of the takeover by Kraft by saying, "We believe the offer represents good value for Cadbury shareholders and are pleased with the commitment that Kraft Foods has made to our heritage, values and people throughout the world."

Acquisition fallout
Cadbury sales were flat after Kraft's acquisition. Despite the Cadbury takeover helping boost sales by 30%, Kraft's net profit for the fourth quarter fell 24% to $540m due to costs associated with integrating the UK business after the acquisition. Kraft spent a one-time $1.3 billion in integration costs to achieve $675 million in recurring annual synergy savings by the end of 2012 (estimated).

Kraft was forced to increase prices to offset rising commodity costs in North America and Europe. Kraft has had to contend with the higher cost of ingredients such as corn, sugar and cocoa. Kraft chief executive Irene Rosenfeld said, “We expect it will remain weak for the foreseeable future.” Taking into account integration costs, the acquisition knocked about 33% off Kraft's earnings per share immediately after the purchase of Cadbury. In March 2011, Kraft caused national outrage when they sold the site of a historic Cadbury factory it vowed not to close for £50million after initially publicly promising the continuity of production within the UK in order to win over support for the deal from shareholders. Instead, production was immediately outsourced to Poland. The Somerdale Factory was closed just days after the takeover by Kraft Foods. Former Cadbury workers demanded an apology for the abrupt selling of the plant, but Kraft's CEO Irene Rosenfeld refused to explain her actions. Kraft continues to use Cadbury brands in emerging markets to expand all of its products. In April 2011, Kraft set to invest $150 million in South Africa's manufacturing plants over three years.  President Sanjay Khosla said, "South Africa is a priority market for us, where we focus on power brands like Cadbury chocolate."

Sale of frozen pizza division to Nestlé

On March 1, 2010, Nestlé concluded the purchase of Kraft's North American frozen pizza business for $3.7 billion. Kraft left the door open to repurchase with a buyback option not before one year and not after three years for the original sale price of $3.7 billion. Although not likely if Kraft were to want to repurchase they would have to come up with cash only and no stocks. The sale included DiGiorno, Tombstone and Jack's brands in the United States, the Delissio brand in Canada and the California Pizza Kitchen trademark license. It also includes two Wisconsin manufacturing facilities in Medford and Little Chute. The business generated 2009 net revenues of $1.6 billion, with 3,400 employees.

Proposed split
After a period of poor share performance and investor criticism, Rosenfeld was forced to announce in 2011 the proposed split of the company into two new entities. Both were to be listed on the New York Stock Exchange, but the company has recently decided to move to NASDAQ, and the split companies will also trade on NASDAQ.  The first entity would retain the Kraft foods names and brands, and focus on the North American foods business. The second, later proposed to be named Mondelēz International, would focus on the global snacks business, and would include the former Cadbury businesses, plus global brands including Dairylea. On April 2, 2012, Kraft Foods Inc. announced that it had filed a Form 10 Registration Statement to the SEC to split the company into two companies to serve the "North American grocery business".  The split was structured so that Kraft Foods changed its name to Mondelez International and spun off Kraft Foods Group as a new publicly traded company.

Sponsorships and promotions
Kraft Foods Inc was an official partner and sponsor of Major League Soccer and sponsored the Kraft Nabisco Championship, one of the four "majors" on the LPGA tour.  The company also sponsored the Kraft Fight Hunger Bowl, a post-season college football bowl game.

Kraft Hockeyville originally was Canadian reality television series developed by CBC Sports in 2006 and was sponsored by Kraft Foods in which communities across Canada compete to demonstrate their commitment to the sport of ice hockey. The contest revolves around a central theme of community spirit in Canada. In  2007, the contest was relegated to segments aired on Hockey Night in Canada.

Kraft released an iPad app called "Big Fork Little Fork" in 2011 which, in addition to games and other distractions, has information regarding how to use Kraft foods in nutritious ways. This app costs $1.99; a version for home computers is available on the iTunes app store.

Brands

Before the company was split, its core businesses were in beverage, cheese, dairy foods, snack foods, confectionery, and convenience foods.

Kraft's major brands, which each generated revenues exceeding $1 billion, as:
 Cadbury
 Jacobs
 Kraft, including Kraft Dinner, Kraft Singles, Kraft Mayo
 LU
 Maxwell House
 Milka
 Nabisco
 Oreo
 Oscar Mayer
 Philadelphia
 Trident
 Tang

Seventy additional brands have revenues greater than $100 million. In total, 40 brands are at least 100 years old.

Controversies

Trans-fat litigation 
In 2003, a California lawyer made national headlines by suing Kraft for using trans fat in Oreo cookies. Kraft foods announced a trans-fat free reformulation of Oreos shortly after the 2003 lawsuit was filed, and the lawsuit was dropped. Kraft denied that the change was made in response to the lawsuit, noting that the reformulation had been in planning long before the lawsuit.

In 2010, two California residents filed a class action lawsuit against Kraft Foods for claiming certain products are healthy when in fact they contain unhealthy trans fat. Kraft denied any wrongdoing, saying all packaging claims are true and legal. As of June 2012, the case is still ongoing.

A United States district judge certified the class on June 6, 2012.

Teddy Grahams, varieties of Ritz Crackers, Honey Maid Grahams, Premium Saltines, Ginger Snaps, and Vegetable Thins all contain artificial trans fat, and Kraft presents these products as healthy with phrases like "wholesome choice", "sensible snacking", and "made with real vegetables". The complaint in the case argues that these claims are a violation of California's Unfair Competition Law, Consumer Legal Remedies Act, and False Advertising Law.

The lawsuit cites current scientific consensus on the dangerous health effects of trans fat, which causes coronary heart disease and has been linked to type 2 diabetes and some forms of cancer. The American Heart Association concludes that there is "no safe level" of trans fat in the diet.

Based on the trans fat content and other unhealthy ingredients in Kraft products, the lawsuit makes several arguments:

Health claims like "a wholesome choice", which appears on Teddy Grahams, and "Sensible Snacking", which appears on several products, are false.
"No cholesterol" claims are misleading because they imply that the snack is good for cholesterol levels, when in fact trans fat is worse for cholesterol health than actual dietary cholesterol.
Claims like "made with real vegetables" or "real ginger & molasses" are misleading because the products contain less of these "real" and healthy ingredients than they contain artificial trans fat.
Teddy Grahams packaging claims to be a "good source of calcium, iron & zinc to support kids' growth and development", but this health claim is deceptive because the trans fat content is more harmful than the minerals are helpful.
Various additional phrases like "whole wheat" and "graham" imply a health benefit that the products do not contain.
On each package, some individual claims may be true, but overall, they add to the deceptive message of healthfulness.

Kraft denies any wrongdoing. Kraft's response briefs emphasize that the challenged claims are technically true. For example, Vegetable Thins are "made with real vegetables", and Kraft argues that this true statement cannot be called misleading. Kraft uses a similar line of argument for claims like "good source of calcium, iron & zinc to support kids' growth and development", "whole wheat", and others.

Regarding several packaging claims, Kraft argues that they are not factual statements that can be proven true or false. For example, Kraft argues that the word "wholesome" is subjective and vague. Promotional statements that are too vague to prove or disprove are called puffery and are not actionable under the law. Kraft argues that "wholesome", "sensible", and "smart" are all puffery and therefore cannot be found misleading or deceitful.

Political campaign 
In 2012, Kraft contributed $1,950,500 to a $46 million political campaign known as "The Coalition Against The Costly Food Labeling Proposition, sponsored by Farmers and Food Producers" The organization was founded to oppose Proposition 37, a California citizen's initiative mandating the labeling of foods containing genetically modified ingredients. As a result, there were calls for a boycott of Kraft products.

Environmental record 
For years Kraft purchased paper for its packaging from Asia Pulp & Paper, the third-largest paper producer in the world which was called a "forest criminal" for destroying "precious habitat" in Indonesia's rain forest. In 2011, when Kraft cancelled its contract with Asia Pulp & Paper, Greenpeace executive director Phil Radford commended the company for "taking rainforest conservation seriously".

In the news
Kraft began a major restructuring process in January 2004, following a year of declining sales (blamed largely on the rising health consciousness of Americans) and the sacking of co-CEO Betsy Holden. The company announced closures of 19 production facilities worldwide and the reduction of 5,500 jobs, as well as the sale of 10% of its branded products.

On January 19, 2010, Kraft sealed the deal to buy 100% of the share capital of Cadbury for over $19 billion.

On March 17, 2010, Kraft Foods said it was "truly sorry" over its closure of a Cadbury factory in Somerdale. Senior Kraft executive Marc Firestone made the public apology to MPs at a parliamentary select committee hearing.

In March 2011, in the US, Kraft Foods introduced MiO, a liquid flavoring product with zero calories and sugar-free geared to 18 to 39-year-old consumers. MiO has no artificial flavors but it does have artificial colors, artificial sweeteners and artificial preservatives, unlike some competing flavoring products, according to USA Today.

In August 2011, Kraft Foods announced plans to split into two publicly traded companies—a snack food company and a grocery company.

On September 10, 2010, a disgruntled employee angered over a recent suspension, Yvonne Hiller, opened fire inside the Philadelphia Factory where she had worked for 15 years. Armed with a .357, Yvonne shot 3 co-workers, killing 2 of them. Philadelphia Police responded within minutes of the 911 call. SWAT took Yvonne into custody at 8:30pm.

Recalls

In September 2000, up to $50 million worth of taco shells were recalled by Kraft from supermarkets and Taco Bell restaurants. The shells contained genetically modified corn, which was not approved for human consumption by the Food and Drug Administration; the recall was the first of a genetically modified food. The corn was supplied to a plant from which Kraft bought the shells.

In April 2009, Kraft Foods recalled products containing pistachios after the discovery of salmonella at one of its Illinois manufacturers. A Washington Post editorial credited the "aggressive food safety system at Kraft Foods" with effectively addressing the danger.

In September 2011, Kraft recalled over 130,000 cases of Velveeta Shells and Cheese microwaveable cups because of possible wire bristles in the cups.

See also

 List of Kraft brands
 List of dairy product companies in the United States
General Foods Corporation
Ovson Egg

References

External links
 – present day successor corporation.
Hoover's.com: Kraft Foods Inc. Fact Sheet
KFT:US Bloomberg News.com: Kraft Foods Inc
Businessweek.com: KFT:New York 
Financial Times.com: Kraft Foods Inc
The New York Times.com: Kraft Foods Inc. — collected news and commentary.
The Wall Street Journal.com: Kraft Foods Inc 
Cjly.net: Kraft Foods Radio Show archive 

.
Food manufacturers of the United States
Heinz
Mondelez International
Condiment companies of the United States
Confectionery companies of the United States
Dairy products companies of the United States
Snack food manufacturers of the United States
Multinational dairy companies
Multinational food companies
Multinational companies headquartered in the United States
Companies based in Cook County, Illinois
Manufacturing companies based in Illinois
Northfield, Illinois
American companies established in 1903
Food and drink companies established in 1903
Food and drink companies disestablished in 2012
1903 establishments in Illinois
2012 disestablishments in Illinois
Companies formerly listed on the New York Stock Exchange
Companies formerly listed on the Nasdaq
Former components of the Dow Jones Industrial Average
Purveyors to the Court of Sweden
Defunct manufacturing companies based in Illinois
General Foods